Natasaarvabhowma ( Emperor of actors) is a 2019 Indian Kannada language action horror film written and directed by Pavan Wadeyar and produced by Rockline Venkatesh. The film stars Puneeth Rajkumar, Anupama Parameswaran  and Rachita Ram in lead roles. P. Ravi Shankar played the antagonist while Chikkanna and Sadhu Kokila  playing supporting roles. While B. Saroja Devi makes guest appearance. 

The film marks the Kannada debut of Anupama Parameswaran and second collaboration between Puneeth Rajkumar-Rachita Ram after Chakravyuha.  Its score and soundtrack is composed by D. Imman, whilst the cinematography is by Vaidy S. The film had a record 1,394 shows on the first day in Karnataka.

Plot 
Central Minister Ghanshyam Yadav is intercepted by some goons. Gagan Dixit, who is a reporter returning from Kolkata, saves Yadav from them. Gagan later realizes that the fight was a staged act by Yadav in order to gain sympathy votes, and he reports to newspaper editor Avinash and publishes this story anonymously. 

Gagan meets up with his old friend Keshav, and they decide to rent a haunted house owned by Namadev, despite Keshav's objections. Gagan convinces Keshav by saying that since he has a sacred thread on his right wrist, they will be fine. Gagan also unsuccessfully tries to call a phone number of someone he is trying to find. They go to a mobile network's office to obtain the location of that number. They meet with Sakshi, the manager who refuses to give it. After the story about the fake fight is published, Yadav becomes infuriated, and the newspaper loses many ads. Avinash sends Gagan to do a special write-up on Yadav by interviewing him in his private jet. After a fairly tense interview in the air, the jet lands in Bellary, and Yadav is ambushed as Gagan is leaving. 

Gagan initially believes it to be another fake fight before realizing that bloodshed unlike in the last fight. Gagan then saves Yadav, putting himself in his good graces. Previously, Gagan had rescued Sakshi from goons in her office, so she had agreed to share the location. But when Gagan visits her, she refuses again since Namadev has told her that it was a set up by Gagan and Keshava to get the location. Gagan goes to Sakshi's office again, but learns that her father suffered from a stroke. Gagan and Yadav manages to rescue her father just in time. Due to this, Sakshi changes her opinion about Gagan and agrees to give details about the phone number. After various paranormal activities in the house, Keshav quarrels with Namadev. 

Gagan tries to break up the fight and consequently loses his sacred thread. He starts experiencing supernatural activities in the house later that night. The next day, Gagan finds some spectacles in a drawer and decides to wear them, and his behavior begins to change after he does. Gagan goes to interview Saroja Devi at a country club; and he notices his vision blurring. He wears the spectacles to regain focus, and he completely shifts his focus on the man in the pool. Gagan relentlessly beats up a lawyer named Prabhakar Reddy and fights off any security who try to hold him back, occasionally asking the man "Why did you kill me?" before Reddy escapes and Gagan loses consciousness.

Gagan and Keshav go to Yadav's birthday bash where they get drunk. Yadav embraces him, and Gagan wears the spectacles to regain focus. He proceeds to beat up Yadav mercilessly in a similar fashion. Yadav survives and Gagan wakes up in prison, with no idea of what happened at the party. Gagan gets bail on the case of mental illness, and the media quickly picks up Gagan's story, focusing that he lives in a supposedly haunted house. An observer explains the suicide of his niece Shruthi, which occurred in that house. Sakshi then reveals that the location of the number Gagan seeks is the same house. Gagan is shocked and reveals the person to be Shruthi. 

Past: Shruthi was working under Reddy as a junior lawyer, who arrived in Kolkata and befriended Gagan after reading the article he wrote on the disabled. They both prepare articles to file a case against Yadav. Gagan proposed to her and asked her to call him after she reaches Bengaluru for her answer, but he hadn't received a call from her due to which he landed in Bangalore. 

Present: Gagan is then taken to Guruji's ashram instead of a mental hospital, where a puja is being performed to get rid of the spirit that has invaded Gagan. Gagan wears the spectacles again, which is revealed to be the same spectacles that Shruthi wore. He violently kills Reddy, before moving to Yadav. Yadav holds Shruthi's uncle as a hostage before someone delivers a final blow. In the court, Guruji reveals that he has saw the violent nature of the spirit while the doctors divulges that he has multiple personality disorder. The court orders Gagan to be sent to a mental hospital. 

Flashback: Gagan stabs Shruthi's uncle before violently killing Yadav. Gagan reveals to Guruji that he was never possessed by anyone. Gagan had a video chat with Shruthi after she had gone home, but he witnesses Yadav, Reddy and her uncle murdering her. Gagan said it was revenge in his mind, not any spirit. He explains that he will be proven both spiritually and scientifically innocent by the court of law and forces Guruji to lie in front of media. 

Present: Back in court, Gagan is in a mental hospital van and sees Guruji in a car who without blinking eyes, looks at him. As Guruji's car leaves, he smiles indicating that he has completed his vengeance and the title Natasaarvabhowma has gained its meaning.

Cast 

Puneeth Rajkumar as Gagan Dixit, a Journalist & Sakshi's love interest 
Anupama Parameswaran as Shruti, a Junior Lawyer & Gagan's ex girlfriend 
Rachita Ram as Sakshi, Manager in Communication Network company & Gagan's love interest 
P. Ravi Shankar as Central Minister Ghanashyam Yadhav
Chikkanna as Keshav, an aspiring film director & Gagan's friend 
Sadhu Kokila as Namadev, Gagan and Keshav's House owner
 Prakash Belawadi as Shruthi's uncle
Achyuth Kumar as Yadhav's Guruji
Srinivasa Murthy as Gagan's father,
Avinash as Avinash head of Newspaper
Prabhakar as Lawyer Prabhakar
Pradeep Doddaiah as News Anchor 
B. Saroja Devi as Herself in a Cameo appearance to be interviewed by Gagan
Jani Master, special appearance in "Open the Bottle"
Rockline Venkatesh, special appearance in "Natasaarvabhouma Title Song"
Choreographer Bhushan, special appearance in "Natasaarvabhouma Title Song"
Avika Gor, Special appearance in "Tajaa Samcahara" song as Bride

Production

Filming 
The main scenes between Puneeth Rajkumar and Anupama Parameshwaran were shot in Kolkata, along with one romantic song.
The Kolkata shooting schedule wrapped up in September 2018.

Music 
The audio launch was on 12 January 2019 in Hubli.

Music 
The soundtrack was composed by D. Imman. Following Puneeth Rajkumar's death in 2021, a tribute track penned by Pawan Wadeyar, which was the original concept for the introduction song for Natasaarvabhowma, was added to the soundtrack on March 17, 2022.

Release 
The film was released on 7 February 2019.

Reception 

The film was released to positive reviews. Sunayana Suresh of The Times of India gave the film 3/5, saying that "the film has the commercial elements in place, but also has a little twist". A. Sharaadha of Cinema Express criticized the pacing and the writing, but commended Puneeth's performance and the roles of the supporting characters. The New Indian Express noted that the movie takes its basic premise and a pivotal event which takes place in the villain's birthday party from the movie Moondru Mugam.

Accolades

References

External links 
 

2019 action films
2010s Kannada-language films
2019 films
Films about journalists
Films directed by Pavan Wadeyar
Films scored by D. Imman
Films set in Bangalore
Films set in Kolkata
Films set in prison
Films set in psychiatric hospitals
Films shot in Bangalore
Films shot in Kolkata
Indian action horror films
Indian courtroom films
Indian films about revenge
Indian haunted house films
Indian nonlinear narrative films
2019 masala films
Rockline Entertainments films